Fiorucci is a surname of Italian origin. Notable people with the surname include:

 Elio Fiorucci (1935–2015), Italian fashion designer and entrepreneur
 Nick Fiorucci, Canadian electronic and dance music DJ, songwriter, and founder of record label Hi-Bias Records
 Vittorio Fiorucci (1932–2008), Italian Canadian poster artist

References

See also 
 Fiori (disambiguation)

Italian-language surnames